Robert Beyer may refer to
Robert D. Beyer (born 1959), American businessman
Robert T. Beyer (1920–2008), American physicist